This is a list of Sydney Swans players who have made one or more appearance in the Australian Football League, known as the Victorian Football League until 1990. The Sydney Swans were previously known as South Melbourne until their relocation in 1982.

South Melbourne/Sydney Swans players

1890s

1900s

1910s

1920s

1930s

1940s

1950s

1960s

1970s

1980s

South Melbourne relocated to Sydney in 1982

1990s

2000s

2010s

2020s

Other players

Listed players yet to make their debut for Sydney

Delisted players who did not play a senior game for Sydney

See also

List of Sydney Swans coaches

References

External links
AFL Tables – All Time Player List – Sydney

Players

Lists of players of Australian rules football
Sydney-sport-related lists